Schedule 5 or Schedule V may refer to:
 Schedule V Controlled Substances within the US Controlled Substances Act
List of Schedule V drugs (US)
 Schedule V Controlled Drugs and Substances within the Canadian Controlled Drugs and Substances Act
 Scheduled Areas in India, from the Fifth Schedule of the Constitution of India

See also 
Schedule 1 (disambiguation)
Schedule 2 (disambiguation)
Schedule 3 (disambiguation)
Schedule 4 (disambiguation)